The 1995 All-Southwest Conference football team consists of American football players chosen by various organizations for All-Southwest Conference teams for the 1995 NCAA Division I-A football season.  The selectors for the 1995 season included the Associated Press (AP). The 1995 team was the final All-Southwest Conference football team due to the conference's dissolution in 1996.

Five teams placed multiple players on the All-Southwest Conference first team as follows:
 Conference champion Texas was ranked No. 14 in the final AP Poll placed six players on the first team: quarterback and SWC Offensive Player of the Year James Brown, tight end Pat Fitzgerald, wide receive Mike Adams, offensive lineman Dan Neil, defensive back Chris Carter, and defensive lineman Tony Brackens.
 Texas A&M was ranked No. 15 in the final AP Poll and also placed six players on the first team: running back and SWC All-Purpose Player of the Year Leeland McElroy, wide receiver Albert Connell, offensive lineman Hunter Goodwin, linebacker Reggie Brown, defensive back Ray Mickens, and defensive lineman Brandon Mitchell
 Texas Tech was ranked No. 23 in the final AP Poll and placed three players on the first team: running back Byron Hanspard, linebacker and SWC Defensive Player of the Year Zach Thomas, and defensive back Marcus Coleman.
 Fourth-place Baylor placed four players on the first team: running back and return specialist Jerod Douglas, offensive lineman Fred Miller, defensive lineman Daryl Gardner, linebacker LaCurtis Jones, and defensive back Adrian Robinson.
 Fifth-place TCU placed three players on the first team: offensive lineman Ryan Tucker, defensive lineman Chris Piland, and placekicker Michael Reeder.

Offensive selections

Quarterbacks
 James Brown, Texas (AP-1)

Running backs
 Byron Hanspard, Texas Tech (AP-1)
 Leeland McElroy, Texas A&M (AP-1)
 Jerod Douglas, Baylor (AP-1)

Tight ends
 Pat Fitzgerald, Texas (AP-1)

Wide receivers
 Mike Adams, Texas (AP-1)
 Albert Connell, Texas A&M (AP-1)

Offensive linemen
 Dan Neil, Texas (AP-1)
 Jimmy Herndon, Houston (AP-1)
 Fred Miller, Baylor (AP-1)
 Hunter Goodwin, Texas A&M (AP-1)
 Ryan Tucker, TCU (AP-1)

Defensive selections

Defensive lineman
 Tony Brackens, Texas (AP-1)
 Brandon Mitchell, Texas A&M (AP-1)
 Daryl Gardner, Baylor (AP-1)
 Chris Piland, TCU (AP-1)

Linebackers
 Zach Thomas, Texas Tech (AP-1)
 Reggie Brown, Texas A&M (AP-1)
 LaCurtis Jones, Baylor (AP-1)

Defensive backs
 Chris Carter, Texas (AP-1)
 Ray Mickens, Texas A&M (AP-1)
 Marcus Coleman, Texas Tech (AP-1)
 Adrian Robinson, Baylor (AP-1)

Special teams

Place-kickers
 Michael Reeder, TCU (AP-1)

Punters
 Tucker Phillips, Rice (AP-1)

Return specialists
 Jerod Douglas, Baylor (AP-1)

Miscellaneous
 All purpose: Leeland McElroy, Texas A&M (AP)
 Offensive Player of the Year: James Brown, Texas (AP)
 Defensive Player of the Year: Zach Thomas, Texas Tech (AP)
 Coach of the Year: John Mackovic, Texas (AP)

Key

AP = Associated Press

References

All-Southwest Conference
All-Southwest Conference football teams